Signe "Ham" Hammarsten-Jansson (née Hammarsten, 1 June 1882 Hannäs, – 6 July 1970) was a Swedish-Finnish graphic artist who designed, among other things, around 220 Finnish postage stamps during the course of three decades. She was the mother of Tove Jansson, creator of the Moomin characters.

Biography
Signe Hammarsten came from a respectable Swedish clerical family and was the child of a pastor's daughter and a court chaplain. Hammarsten's parents were opposed to her becoming an artist, and as a girl she had considered a career as a surgeon. Hammarsten went through 8 years of primary school, and then studied at Stockholm University between 1901 and 1905. She began to work as a drawing teacher at a Stockholm girls' school.

It was during a study trip to Paris in 1910 that Hammarsten met and fell in love with the 24-year-old Finnish sculptor, Viktor Jansson. In 1913 they were married and they lived in Paris for a year before moving to Finland in 1914. A daughter was born to the couple shortly thereafter, and Hammarsten-Jansson resumed work as an illustrator. In 1924, Hammarsten-Jansson became a  draughtsperson for the Bank of Finland. Here, between 1929 and 1962, Hammarsten-Jansson designed over 200 stamps.

The couple had three children in total: Tove Jansson, Lars Jansson and Per Olov Jansson. Born to artistic parents, the children grew up in a Bohemian lifestyle, and all became artists in their own right. Tove became a writer and painter and would gain particular fame for her Moomin series. Lars became a cartoonist, ultimately becoming responsible for the Moomin comic strips as well as a later animated version. Per Olov became a photographer and collaborated with Tove on a few books. The children were directly influenced by their mother's artistic sensibilities and Tove in particular retained a close connection, only leaving the house at age 28.

Tove has written that she felt her mother understood her better than anyone else and even toward the end of her life, Tove "always tried to resemble [her] Mother, always tried to draw like [her] Mother." In 1928, at age 14, Tove noted that "Mother has important drawing work. (...) I am waiting for the time when I will be able to help her with her drawings. Mother does so much work by herself." Hammarsten-Jansson's death in 1970 profoundly impacted her daughter's writing and it has been suggested that her presence is strongly felt in a number of the books Tove wrote after the death. The melancholic Moominvalley in November (1970) deals themes of leaving and loneliness, and is typically considered the most mature of the Moomin series. The Summer Book (1972) concerns a young girl whose mother has died and her relationship with her grandmother. Hammarsten-Jansson's death marked the end of the Moomin series of novels and Jansson's literary output became primarily adult-oriented.

References

1882 births
1970 deaths
People from Åtvidaberg Municipality
Swedish illustrators
Moomins
Swedish women illustrators
Swedish children's book illustrators
Philately of Finland
Swedish emigrants to Finland